Llanbadarn-y-Garreg is a village in the  community of Aberedw, Powys, Wales. It is 45.1 miles (72.6 km) from Cardiff and 141.9 miles (228.4 km) from London.

Llanbadarn-y-Garreg is represented in the Senedd by Kirsty Williams (Liberal Democrats) and in the UK parliament by Christopher Davies, (Conservative Party) MP for Brecon and Radnorshire.

See also 
 List of towns in Wales

References 

Villages in Powys